Dom Raimundo of Lencastre ( ? – Cadiz, 1666) was the older son of George of Lencastre, 1st Duke of Torres Novas, and grandson of Álvaro and Juliana of Lencastre, 3rd Dukes of Aveiro.

Once his father died before his grandmother, in 1632, he succeed him as heir of the House of Aveiro, as 4th Marquis of Torres Novas and 2nd Duke of Torres Novas. He also became 4th Duke of Aveiro when his grandmother, the 3rd Duchess, died in 1636.

When the Braganzas expelled the Habsburgs from the Portuguese throne, in 1640, he was nominee member of the Portuguese State Council. However, after 1659, he fled to Brest, in Brittany, and from there he travelled to Spain, where he supported the Spanish Habsburgs rights to the throne of Portugal.

He was quite welcomed in Madrid by King Philip IV of Spain, who granted him the new Spanish title of Duke of Ciudad Real, but, in spite his mother and sister also lived in Madrid, he didn't feel comfortable among the conservative Spanish nobility.

Meanwhile, in Portugal, Dom Raimundo of Lencastre was condemn for treason (in 1663) and the King of Portugal, John IV, confiscated the Dukedom and granted it to Raimundo's uncle, Peter of Lencastre, a Braganza supporter, who was recognised as 5th Duke of Aveiro and 5th Marquis of Torres Novas.

In 1665, the Spanish tried a last effort to conquer Portugal and Dom Raimundo advised a simultaneous naval expedition, leaving from Cadiz, against the Portuguese cost, which he led. The expedition was not successful and Raimundo died in Cadiz in 1666.

He had married Louise Claire of Ligne (1640–1684), daughter of Claude-Lamoral, 3rd Prince of Ligne. They had no issue.

Raimundo had three natural children:
Pedro of Lencastre, who died fighting in Sicily;
Genebra Simões, with issue known today in Portugal (family Meireles Garrido);
Micaela Maria de Mendonça († 1718 in Torres Vedras), married to João Boto Pimentel Côrte-Real (1642–1715), with known issue.

Titles
In Portugal – Marquis of Torres Novas (1632–1636), Duke of Torres Novas (1632–1636), Duke of Aveiro (1636–1663).
In Spain – Duke of Ciudad Real, Duke of Maqueda, Marquis of Montemayor, Marquis of Elche, Captain-General of the Ocean Armada and Mayor of the city of Toledo.

External links
 Genealogy of Raimundo of Lencastre, 4th Duke of Aveiro, in Portuguese

Bibliography
 ”Nobreza de Portugal e do Brasil” – Vol. II, pages 344 and 345; Vol. III, pages 446 and 447. Published by Zairol Lda., Lisbon 1989.

104
102
Aveiro
1666 deaths
Year of birth unknown